Takashi Ohno (born on Kodiak Island, Alaska) is an American politician and a Democratic member of the Hawaii House of Representatives since January 16, 2013 representing District 27.

Ohno announced in March 2022 that he will not be running for re-election in the 2022 Hawaii House of Representatives election, and will leave the Legislature to work in the private sector after his term ends.

Education
Ohno earned his bachelor's degree in education from Linfield College and his MEd from Chaminade University of Honolulu.

Elections
2012 Challenging incumbent Republican Representative Corinne Ching for the District 27 seat, Ohno was unopposed for the District 27 August 11, 2012 Democratic Primary, winning with 3,986 votes, and won the November 6, 2012 General election with 4,843 votes (55.6%) against Representative Ching, who had held the seat since 2003.

References

External links
Official page at the Hawaii State Legislature
 

Year of birth missing (living people)
Living people
Chaminade University of Honolulu alumni
Linfield University alumni
Democratic Party members of the Hawaii House of Representatives
People from Alaska
21st-century American politicians
Hawaii politicians of Japanese descent